The  Children Act 1948 was an Act of Parliament in the United Kingdom that established a comprehensive childcare service. The law followed the Curtis Report, which addressed child welfare and was released by a government committee headed by Dame Myra Curtis. The Act was strongly influenced by the inquiry into the Dennis O'Neill case. The law reformed the services available to deprived children, consolidating existing childcare legislation and establishing departments “in which professional social work practice would develop in child care and, in due course, in work with families.” The Act made it clear that it was the duty of local authorities to receive into care any child who was without parents or whose parents could not care for him for any reason, if it was in the interest of the child’s welfare.

The new duties imposed upon local authorities by the legislation (particularly to receive deprived children into care) resulted in childcare services working more closely with families. The Act also led to a new approach towards parent-child relations, encouraging the newly established Children’s Departments ‘to view children as individual human beings with both shared and individualised needs, rather than an indistinct mass.”

Notes

United Kingdom Acts of Parliament 1948
Juvenile law
Youth in the United Kingdom